The Battle of Haengju took place on 14 March 1593 during the 1592–1598 Japanese invasion of Korea. The Japanese attack failed to overcome Haengju fortress.

Background
Gwon Yul was stationed at the fortress of Haengju, a wooden stockade on a cliff over the Han River. Haengju posed a threat to Hanseong (modern Seoul) due to its proximity so the Japanese attacked it in March.

The attack
The Japanese attack led by Konishi Yukinaga happened on 14 March 1593 with 30,000 men. They took turns attacking the stockade due to the limited space. The Koreans retaliated with arrows, cannons, and hwacha.

After three attacks, one with siege tower, and one where Ishida Mitsunari was wounded, Ukita Hideie managed to breach the outer defenses and reach the inner wall. However he was wounded as well and had to fall back.

In the last attack Kobayakawa Takakage burned a hole through the fort's log pilings, but the Koreans managed to hold them back long enough for it to be repaired.

When the Koreans had nearly run out of arrows, I Bun arrived with supply ships containing 10,000 more arrows, and they continued to fight on until dusk when the Japanese retreated.

Aftermath
Aside from the defeat, the Japanese situation became even more tenuous after Zha Dashou led a small group of raiders to Hanseong, burning more than 6,500 tons of grain. This left the Japanese with less than a month of provisions.

After several negotiations with Shen Weijing, the Japanese abandoned Hanseong on 17 May 1593. What Li Rusong and Song Yingchang witnessed upon entering the city was a people who "looked like ghosts."

See also 
 Castles in Korea
 1592–1598 Japanese invasion of Korea
 Gwon Yul

Citations

Bibliography

 
 
 
 
 
 
 
 
 
 
 桑田忠親 [Kuwata, Tadachika], ed., 舊參謀本部編纂, [Kyu Sanbo Honbu], 朝鮮の役 [Chousen no Eki]　(日本の戰史 [Nihon no Senshi] Vol.5), 1965.

External links
Haengju Mountain Fortress
행주산성
역사스페셜 – 승리를 이끈 하이테크 신무기

Haengju
1593 in Asia
1593 in Japan
Haengju
Haengju